The 1970 Fresno State Bulldogs football team represented Fresno State College—now known as California State University, Fresno—as a member of the Pacific Coast Athletic Association (PCAA) during the 1970 NCAA University Division football season. Led by fifth-year head coach Darryl Rogers, the Fresno State compiled an overall record of 8–4 with a mark of 4–2 in conference play, placing third in the PCAA. The Bulldogs played their home games at Ratcliffe Stadium on the campus of Fresno City College in Fresno, California.

Schedule

References

Fresno State
Fresno State Bulldogs football seasons
Fresno State Bulldogs football